Bicyclus angulosa, the startled bush brown, is a butterfly in the family Nymphalidae. It is found from Senegal to Cameroon, in the Central African Republic, the Democratic Republic of the Congo, Sudan, Uganda, Ethiopia, Kenya, Angola, Tanzania, Zambia, Malawi, Mozambique and Zimbabwe. The habitat consists of dense savanna, including Brachystegia woodland.

Both sexes are attracted by fermenting fruit. Adults of the wet-season form are on wing from December to May, while adults of the dry-season form are found from May to September.

Subspecies
Bicyclus angulosa angulosa (Senegal to Cameroon, Central African Republic, northern and eastern Democratic Republic of the Congo, Sudan, Uganda, western Kenya, Ethiopia)
Bicyclus angulosa selousi (Trimen, 1895) (Angola, southern Democratic Republic of the Congo, Tanzania, Zambia, Malawi, Mozambique, northern and north-eastern Zimbabwe)

References

Elymniini
Butterflies described in 1868
Butterflies of Africa
Taxa named by Arthur Gardiner Butler